Fun to the World is the fourth extended play by South Korean girl group Momoland. It was released by MLD Entertainment and distributed by Kakao M on June 26, 2018. For the extended play, Momoland worked with a variety of producers including Shinsadong Tiger, Pinkmoon, Stainboys and Monster Factory. Fun to the World consists of five tracks including the single "Baam" and its instrumental and four other new tracks.

To promote the extended play, the group performed on several South Korean music show programs, such as M Countdown and Inkigayo. Commercially, the album peaked at number six on South Korea's Gaon Album Chart.

Release 
The extended play was released on June 26, 2018, through several music portals, including Melon and iTunes.

Commercial performance 
In South Korea, the extended play debuted and peaked at number six on the Gaon Album Chart for the week of June 30, 2018. It was the twentieth best-selling album for June 2018, with 9,347 physical copies sold. It has sold over 14,498 copies as of August 2018.

Track listing

Charts

Credits and personnel
Credits adapted from Melon.
 Momoland – vocals 
 Beom x Nang – lyricist , composer 
 Monster Factory – lyricist , composer , arrangement 
 Pinkmoon – lyricist , composer , arrangement 
 Shinsadong Tiger – lyricist , composer , arrangement 
 Stainboys – composer , arrangement

Release history

References 

Momoland albums
2018 EPs